The year 1900 was marked, in science fiction, by the following events.

Births and deaths

Births 
 April 1 :   Fernand François, French writer (d. 1991).
 May 22 : Wallace West, American writer (d. 1980).

Deaths

Events

Awards 
The main science-fiction Awards known at the present time did not exist at this time.

Literary releases

Novels

Stories collections

Short stories

Comics

Audiovisual outputs

Movies 
  Coppelia : La Poupée animée, by Georges Méliès.
 Going to Bed Under Difficulties (in French : Le Déshabillage impossible), by Georges Méliès.

See also 
 1900 in science
 1901 in science fiction

References

Science fiction by year

science-fiction